Bishop of Bendigo may refer to:

 Anglican Bishop of Bendigo
 Bishop of the Roman Catholic Diocese of Sandhurst